The Great Betrayal: The Memoirs of Ian Douglas Smith is a 1997 autobiographic apologia written by Ian Smith, focusing on his time as Prime Minister of the British self-governing colony of Southern Rhodesia, later Rhodesia (April 13, 1964 – June 1, 1979).

The memoirs cover the time period during which Smith's government attempted to preserve white minority rule in Rhodesia through political and military means, including a Unilateral Declaration of Independence from the United Kingdom, and the termination of Smith's government with the resumption of the UK's rule and the recognised independence of Zimbabwe in 1980.

In the book, Ian Smith sought to explain the reasons why his government made its Unilateral Declaration of Independence, and how Rhodesia coped in the face of sanctions and the Rhodesian Bush War until the pressures forced him and his government to accede to the wishes of his adversaries. Smith points to the chaotic situation in Zimbabwe after 1980 as proof that he was trying to prevent Rhodesia from suffering the same fate as other majority-ruled African states.

The book was republished in 2001 with the title Bitter Harvest: The Great Betrayal. After Smith's death in 2007, the book was also reprinted in May 2008 with a foreword by Rupert Cornwell, and a brief postscript.

References

1997 non-fiction books
Books about Rhodesia
Books about Zimbabwe
Political autobiographies